The Church of All Saints which sits on a hillside above Selworthy, Somerset, England is a whitewashed 15th-century Church, with a 14th-century tower. It has been designated by English Heritage as a Grade I listed building.

The pulpit includes a 17th-century hourglass and the iron-bound parish chest dates from the same time. Within the church is a copy of the Chained Book of 1609 by Bishop John Jewel, entitled Defense of the Apologie of the Church of England.

In the churchyard is a medieval cross with three octagonal steps, a square socket, and an octagonal shaft. The head is missing. The churchyard provides views across the valley to Dunkery Beacon.

The WW2 cryptographer, William Clarke is buried there.

See also

 List of Grade I listed buildings in West Somerset
 List of towers in Somerset
 List of ecclesiastical parishes in the Diocese of Bath and Wells

References

15th-century church buildings in England
Church of England church buildings in West Somerset
Grade I listed churches in Somerset
Grade I listed buildings in West Somerset